Mäntyharju (literally 'Pine Ridge') is a municipality of Finland.

It is located in the Southern Savonia region. The municipality has a population of 
which 
is water. The coastline is almost . The population density is 6.2 inhabitants per km².

Neighbouring municipalities: Heinola, Hirvensalmi, Kouvola, Mikkeli, Pertunmaa and Savitaipale.

The summer houses or cottages located in the countryside are part of the culture of Finland  where most Finnish families spend their summer holidays. Mäntyharju is the municipality which has the fifth most summer houses in Finland. Some of the reasons for Mäntyharju's popularity involve its many pure lakes and a relatively short distance to the Finnish capital Helsinki of approximately 200 kilometres by car. The municipality also has a direct, high-speed train connection to the capital area. Because of the many summer houses, the population of Mäntyharju more than triples during the most popular summer holiday times.

Art Centre Salmela in Mäntyharju hosts one of Finland's largest cultural events in July–August.

The municipality is unilingually Finnish.

History 
The modern Mäntyharju municipality is on the border between the historical Tavastia, Savonia and Karelia regions. The parish of Mäntyharju was formed in 1595 out of Iitti, Sysmä, Pellosniemi (see Mikkeli, Mikkelin maalaiskunta) and Taipalsaari. Before that, there was already a chapel in the village of Kyttälä, at the time part of Iitti.

After the Treaty of Turku in 1743, western Mäntyharju remained Swedish while the eastern part, including the church, was ceded to Russia. The parts were reunited in 1821, when Old Finland was added to the Grand Duchy. Pertunmaa became a separate parish in May 20th of 1924 and a municipality in 1926, also including smaller parts of Hartola and Joutsa.

Notable people
Antti Häkkänen (b. 1985), former Minister of Justice of Finland 2017-2019
Antti Jaatinen (b. 1987), ice hockey player
Sami Savio - (b. 1975) Politician
Edward Vesala (1945–1999),  Finnish avant-garde jazz composer, bandleader and drummer.

See also
 Repovesi National Park

References

External links

Municipality of Mäntyharju – Official site

 
Populated places established in 1595